The Blue Line is a Pittsburgh Light Rail line that runs between Downtown Pittsburgh via the Overbrook neighborhood to South Hills Village (formerly 47S South Hills Village via Overbrook).

History 
The line from South Hills Junction to Castle Shannon (now called the Overbrook Line) was first constructed by the Pittsburgh and Castle Shannon Railroad between 1872 and 1874. In 1905 Pittsburgh Railways leased the route and between 1909 and 1910 converted it from narrow gauge to dual gauge and installed overhead power for trolleys.

Mid-20th century PCC streetcars continued to operate on the Overbrook Line until 1993, when concerns about the safety of the line led PAT to suspend service there pending reconstruction. This former Pittsburgh Railways trolley line had never been updated to current light rail system requirements.  After receiving federal funding for Stage Two of the light rail system development, the Overbrook line was reconstructed as a fully rebuilt double-tracked line served by modern light rail vehicles, making this line a considerably faster commute.

The line was reopened on June 2, 2004, following major work which included doubling of the track and elimination of 22 traditional street level trolley stops in favor of eight new LRV style stations with platforms.

Route 
The line starts at Allegheny station on the North Shore, makes an additional stop at North Side, then proceeds under the Allegheny River and continues underground to Gateway Center, Wood Street and Steel Plaza. The line then surfaces at First Avenue. Leaving downtown, it crosses the Monongahela River on the Panhandle Bridge, stopping at Station Square before running through the Mount Washington Transit Tunnel. At South Hills Junction the Library branch rejoins the Beechview line and the former Brown Line, which ran over Mount Washington through the Allentown neighborhood. The Blue Line continues south through Beltzhoover, Bon Air, Carrick, Brookline, and Overbrook. At Bethel Park a transfer is provided to the Red Line, which reaches the same location via Beechview. Beyond Washington Junction the line splits.

The South Hills Village branch was created in 1987 to complement the Red Line, which runs through Beechview before reaching the same terminus.  This line was originally operated using PCCs, most notably the 4000 series, because the new light rail cars were incompatible with the Overbrook line due to its age and condition.  Service was suspended when the Overbrook Line closed in 1993, but was reinstated after that line was rebuilt and reopened in 2004.

On June 25, 2012, the Port Authority closed two stations on the South Hills Village Branch as part of a system-wide consolidation: Santa Barbara and Martin Villa.

Until February 2020 the line consisted of 36 stations including the Library branch which was later adopted exclusively by the Silver Line.

Station list 
The Pittsburgh Light Rail has three types of stations. They are low platform, high platform, and underground. High platform and underground stations are wheelchair accessible as the train doors are level with the platform. Low platform stations are not wheelchair accessible as they require passengers to climb stairs to board the light rail vehicle.

References

External links 

 Blue line schedule

Light rail in Pennsylvania
Electric railways in Pennsylvania
Port Authority of Allegheny County
Underground rapid transit in the United States
5 ft 2½ in gauge railways in the United States
Streetcars in Pennsylvania
Passenger rail transportation in Pennsylvania
Transportation in Pittsburgh
650 V DC railway electrification